Groux Rock is an isolated rock outcrop in the northern part of the Phillips Mountains,  east-northeast of Mount June, in the Ford Ranges of Marie Byrd Land, Antarctica. It was mapped by the United States Geological Survey from surveys and U.S. Navy air photos (1959–65), and was named by the Advisory Committee on Antarctic Names for Roger G. Groux, a U.S. Navy shipfitter with the Byrd Station winter party, 1967.

References

Rock formations of Marie Byrd Land